The 2012 season is FC Seoul's 29th season in the K League 1.

Pre-season
 In Guam: From 9 January 2012 to 27 January 2012
 In Kagoshima, Japan: From 5 February 2012 to 22 February 2012

Pre-season match results

Competitions

Overview

K League

League table

Results summary

Results by round

Matches

FA Cup

Match reports and match highlights
Fixtures and Results at FC Seoul Official Website

Season statistics

K League records

All competitions records

Attendance records

 Season total attendance is K League, FA Cup, AFC Champions League in the aggregate and friendly match attendance is not included.

Squad statistics

Appearances
Statistics accurate as of match played 28 June 2012

Goals and assists

Discipline

Coaching staff

Players

Team squad
All players registered for the 2012 season are listed.

(Conscripted)

(In & Conscripted)

(Conscripted)

(Out)
(Out)
(Discharged)
(Discharged)

(In)

(Out)

(Conscripted)

(Conscripted)

(Discharged)

Out on loan & military service

 In : Transferred from other teams in the middle of season.
 Out : Transferred to other teams in the middle of season.
 Discharged : Transferred from Sangju Sangmu and Police FC for military service in the middle of season. (Registered in 2012 season)
 Conscripted : Transferred to Sangju Sangmu and Police FC for military service after end of season.

Transfers

In

Rookie Draft 

 (Univ.) means player who go to university then back to FC Seoul.
 (After Univ.) means player who is joined FC Seoul after entering university.

Out

Loan & Military service

Tactics

Tactical analysis

Starting eleven and formation 
This section shows the most used players for each position considering a 4–3–3 or 4-2-3-1 formation.

Substitutes

See also
 FC Seoul

References

 FC Seoul 2012 Matchday Magazines

External links
 FC Seoul Official Website 

FC Seoul seasons
Seoul